Gazuiyeh (also Romanized as Gazūīyeh; also known as Gazūyeh) is a village in Vahdat Rural District, in the Central District of Zarand County, Kerman Province, Iran. At the 2006 census, its population was 43, in 10 families.

References 

Populated places in Zarand County